Johnny Adams (born June 9, 1989) is a former Canadian football cornerback of the Canadian Football League (CFL). He played college football for the Michigan State Spartans. He attended Buchtel High School when he was a member of the football, basketball, and track & field teams and succeeded in all three sports.

Biography
Was a four-year starter at Buchtel High School in Akron, Ohio.
Earned all-city and team MVP honors as a senior after recording 115 tackles and three interceptions to go along with 1,800 all-purpose yards and 15 touchdowns.
Earned all-district and all-city first-team honors after intercepting six passes, accounting for 2,200 all-purpose yards and 13 total touchdowns (three on returns).
Returned nine punts for touchdowns as a sophomore, including three in a game against Central Hower.
Also participated in basketball and track.
Earned his bachelor's degree in sociology at Michigan State.
A native of Akron, Ohio.

College
Started 39-of-54 career games at Michigan State, finishing with 157 tackles, 35 passes defensed and 11 interceptions.
Was a three-time All-Big Ten selection (2010–12).
Ranked fourth in school history in interception return yards (230), fifth in passes defensed (35) and 10th in interceptions (11).
As a senior in 2012, was a First-team All-Big Ten selection by the league's coaches after starting 12 games, collecting 35 tackles and tying a team-high three interceptions and 10 passes defensed.
As a junior in 2011, was named First-team All-Big Ten by the league's coaches, finishing with a career-high 51 tackles, nine passes defensed, three interceptions and 3.0 sacks.
As a sophomore in 2010, earned Second-team All-Big Ten honors by the league's coaches after starting all 13 games and totaling 50 tackles, 10 passes defensed and three interceptions.
Saw action in 12 games (two starts) as a true freshman in 2008, collecting 21 tackles (15 solo), six passes defensed and two interceptions.

Professional career

Houston Texans
Adams was signed by the Texans after the 2013 NFL Draft as an undrafted member of the team.

Indianapolis Colts
Adams was signed in August 2013 and waived before the regular season. He returned to the team in June 2014 as a current practice squad member.

Buffalo Bills
Adams was placed in the practice squad until he moved up in the depth chart due to injuries in the Buffalo Bills roster, he played a total of four games in which he made his professional NFL debut and then were placed back to the practice squad when the players injuries were healed for the rest of time as a Bill. He was a member between early-November 2013 to late-November 2013.

Oakland Raiders
Adams was on the practice squad as of December 2013 until then waived as of March 2014.

Indianapolis Colts
Adams was re-signed by the Indianapolis Colts on June 4, 2014, but later waived on August 25, 2014.

Winnipeg Blue Bombers
Adams signed with the Winnipeg Blue Bombers (CFL) on February 6, 2015. Adams had a very strong first season in the CFL, playing in all 18 regular season games and contributing 64 defensive tackles to go along with 6 interceptions. His efforts resulted in him being named a 2015 CFL West All-Star.

Hamilton Tiger-cats
On September 28, 2016, the Blue Bombers traded Adams to the Hamilton Tiger-Cats (CFL) for the rights of a negotiation list player. Adams played in 4 games with the Tiger-Cats, totaling 19 tackles. Following the 2016 season he was not re-signed by the Ti-Cats and became a free agent on February 14, 2017.

Edmonton Eskimos 
On March 16, 2017, Adams signed with the Edmonton Eskimos (CFL).

References

1989 births
Living people
American football cornerbacks
Buffalo Bills players
Canadian football defensive backs
Houston Texans players
Indianapolis Colts players
Michigan State Spartans football players
Oakland Raiders players
Players of American football from Akron, Ohio
Winnipeg Blue Bombers players
Hamilton Tiger-Cats players
Edmonton Elks players
Players of Canadian football from Ohio